Sir Édouard Percy Cranwill Girouard,  (26 January 1867 – 26 September 1932) was a Canadian railway builder, High Commissioner of Northern Nigeria and the East Africa Protectorate.

Education
Born in Montreal, Quebec, the son of Désiré Girouard and Essie Cranwill, he attended Collège de Montréal (1877–1878) and College St. Joseph in Trois-Rivières (1879–1882) and graduated from the Royal Military College of Canada in Kingston, Ontario, in 1886. Girouard's father was a wealthy French-Canadian lawyer who went on to become a Conservative MP and Supreme Court justice while his mother was an Irish immigrant. Unlike most of the other members of the French-Canadian elite of Montreal, Girourad was not educated at Laval University, the traditional training ground of the Francophone elite, instead electing for an education in English at the Royal Military College. Girouard graduated first in his class as an engineer, and was the first Roman Catholic ever to be awarded a degree in engineering at the Royal Military College.

Career
Girouard worked for two years on the Canadian Pacific Railway's "International Railway of Maine" in Greenville, Maine, before he was commissioned in the Royal Engineers in 1888. Quickly earning a reputation as a very able and tough railroad man due to his work in Maine led to Girouard being offered a position in Britain in 1890. Girouard's family wanted him to stay in Canada, but Girouard wanted to see the world by building railroads all over the British Empire.

Railway-building in Sudan and Egypt 
From 1890 to 1895 he was in charge of the Woolwich Arsenal Railway before he joined the Dongola Expedition in 1896 and was asked by Kitchener to supervise the extension of the old Wadi-Halfa to Akasha railroad, which marked the beginning of the Sudan Military Railroad. Kitchener had asked for Girouard as he was reputably the best railroad builder in the entire British Empire. On 20 March 1896, the town of Akasheh was taken by Sir Archibald Hunter, and Girouard went to work building a railroad across the desert. By 4 August 1896 Girouard reported to Kitchener the railroad now extended from Wali Halfa to Kosheh, covering some 116 miles of arid desert.

Building a railroad in the desert in the 19th century presented major challenges such as attacks from the Ansar, a workforce of about 800 Sudanese who knew nothing about building railroads and had to be taught everything, the occasional heavy rain that washed away the track, the need to import everything, and a cholera epidemic which killed off most of the workers in August 1896. Girouard had to establish two technical schools to train his Sudanese workers about how to work as station masters, yard shunters and signalers as none of those skills were known in the Sudan which had never known railroads. In his 1899 book The River War, Winston Churchill praised Girouard as an extraordinarily capable man who made the advance into the Sudan possible.  After the British defeated the Ansar at the Battle of Hafir on 19 September 1896, Dongola was taken on 24 September 1896. These victories were largely made possible by the railroad Girouard built, which allowed Kitchener to bring in enough supplies and men to apply crushing firepower against the Ansar.

In 1897 he was ordered by Kitchener to build a railway from Wadi Halfa to Abu Hamed, 235 miles directly across the Nubian Desert, which eliminated 500 miles of navigation up the Nile River. This was highly risky as Girouard had always built his railroad close to the Nile, where there were gunboats to protect his workers from Ansar attacks, but he accepted the risk and went to work. Girouard frequently traveled up and down the railroad, supervising the work as he had little faith in the ability of his Sudanese workers to build a railroad on their own. When Kitchener purchased several locomotives that Girouard deemed too light to operate in the desert, the latter went to Britain to personally buy heavier locomotives from the United States and while borrowing several more from Cecil Rhodes in South Africa. The millionaire Rhodes, who made a fortune in the diamond and gold mines of South Africa had a great dream of building the Cape to Cairo Railway that would run from Cape Town across Africa to Cairo. In turn, the "Cape to Cairo railroad" would be the device for the British colonization of much of Africa as Rhodes had grandiose plans for settling millions of British settlers in Africa. As such, Rhodes was keen to do everything to help Kitchener conquer the Sudan so he could build his "Cape to Cairo railroad". The strong-willed Girouard was well known for his willingness to argue with Kitchener, a man whom many found to be very intimidating, and despite their frequent disagreements Kitchener never sacked him. This line that Girouard built allowed Kitchener to move the Egyptian and British armies under his command into the heart of the Sudan and defeat the forces of the Khalifa at Atbara and Omdurman in 1898. He received the Distinguished Service Order (DSO) following the defeat of the Sudanese. By then Girouard had been appointed President of Egyptian State Railways and was responsible for clearing the congestion at the Port of Alexandria. In 1902, he was awarded the Second Class of the Imperial Ottoman Order of the Medjidie "in recognition of his services as President of the Council of Administration of the Egyptian Railways, Telegraphs, and the Port of Alexandria".

South Africa, 1899–1904 
In October 1899 Girouard was sent by the War Office to South Africa to advise on the railway situation of the Cape Colony. When the Boer War (1899–1902) broke out he became Director of Imperial Military Railways which included the lines in the Cape, as well as the lines taken over from the Boers in the Orange Free State and the Transvaal. His rapid reconstruction of the damaged lines and the innovative low level deviations around destroyed bridges, enabled the rapid movement of men and material to support the rapid advance of Lord Robert's forces in 1900 to capture Pretoria. He was mentioned in dispatches (31 March 1900 and 23 June 1902), received the South Africa Medal, and in November 1900 he was knighted as a Knight Commander of the Order of St Michael and St George (KCMG) for his service in the war. Lord Kitchener wrote in a despatch how Girouard had been his "principal adviser in all the numerous and intricate questions pertaining to railway administration in South Africa", and concluded that "he is an officer of brilliant ability." After the end of the war, the Imperial Military Railways was renamed as the Central South African Railways in July 1902. Girouard remained in South Africa as Commissioner of the Railways (with the local rank of lieutenant-colonel) until pressure from the Johannesburg mine owners to reduce railway expenses forced his resignation in 1904.

High Commissioner, Nigeria and East Africa, 1906–1912 
In 1906, Winston Churchill, then Under-Secretary of State at the Colonial Office, promoted Girouard as the successor to Sir Frederick Lugard as High Commissioner in Northern Nigeria. Girouard was also responsible for building a railway from Baro, on the Niger River, 366 miles north to the ancient city of Kano. As High Commissioner he also supported the work of the Northern Nigerian Lands Committee and the legislation which resulted from this work had the effect of preventing the establishment of private property in land. He then served as Commissioner of the British East Africa Protectorate (Kenya) from 1909 to 1912. His involvement in the controversial move of the Maasai led to a smoldering dispute with the Colonial Secretary, Lord Milner, who accepted his resignation in 1912. By then Girouard had been offered a position as the managing director of the Eslwick Works of the armaments and shipbuilding concern of Armstrong Whitworth and Co. Ltd.

Later career and life, 1912–1932 
From 1912 until 1923 Girouard remained at Armstrong's except for a brief period in 1915 when the "Shell Crisis" forced the British Government to abandon its "business as usual" policy. Kitchener had asked Girouard for advice on the production of munitions and supported his appointment as Director General of Munitions in the newly formed Ministry of Munitions under Lloyd George. But Girouard could not work under a politician and six weeks later he returned to work at Armstrongs.

Girouard died in London, England, in 1932. He is buried in Brookwood Cemetery in Surrey.

Family
In 1903 he married Mary Gwendolen Solomon, the only child of Sir Richard Solomon, at Pretoria, Transvaal. Their only child was Richard Desire Girouard (1905–1989), who is the father of Mark Girouard, the writer and architectural historian.

Legacy

Mount Girouard, which is located in the Bow River Valley south of Lake Minnewanka, Fairholme Range, in Banff National Park, Alberta. was named in his honour in 1904. Latitude 51; 14; 15, longitude 115; 24; 05.

The Girouard Academic Building at the Royal Military College of Canada in Kingston, Ontario, was named in his honour in 1977.
A plaque honouring Sir Edouard Percy Cranwill Girouard 1867–1932 was erected in 1985 by the Historic Sites and Monuments Board of Canada in a breezeway between the Girouard and Sawyer Buildings at the Royal Military College of Canada "Born in Montréal, Girouard was educated at Royal Military College, Kingston, commissioned in the Royal Engineers in 1888, and appointed to the Royal Arsenal Railways at Woolwich. Charged in 1896 with construction of the Wadi Halfa – Khartoum Railway, he was later director of railways in South Africa and as high commissioner in Northern Nigeria superintended the building of a line to Kano. Governor of Northern Nigeria (1908–9), of East Africa (1909–12), and director general of munitions supply in the British government (1915–16), he also wrote several books on the strategic importance of railways."

The Irish historian Donal Lowry used Girouard's career as an example of "French-Canadian loyalism" to the British Empire in the Victorian and Edwardian eras, using him together with men such as Sir Wilfrid Laurier, who served as Prime Minister between 1896 and 1911; Louis-Honoré Fréchette, considered to be the most talented French-Canadian poet of his generation; Sir Adolphe-Basile Routhier who wrote the national anthem O Canada in 1880; and Major Talbot Mercer Papineau, the politician and soldier who might had become Prime Minister had he not been killed at the battle of Passchendaele in 1917; who all identified with the British Empire.

References

 Sir Édouard Percy Cranwill Girouard at The Canadian Encyclopedia

Books and articles
4237 Dr. Adrian Preston & Peter Dennis (Edited) "Swords and Covenants" Rowman And Littlefield, London. Croom Helm. 1976.
H16511 Dr. Richard Arthur Preston "To Serve Canada: A History of the Royal Military College of Canada" 1997 Toronto, University of Toronto Press, 1969.
H16511 Dr. Richard Arthur Preston "Canada's RMC – A History of Royal Military College" Second Edition 1982
H16511 Dr. Richard Preston "R.M.C. and Kingston: The effect of imperial and military influences on a Canadian community" 1968 Kingston, Ontario.
H1877 R. Guy C. Smith (editor) "As You Were! Ex-Cadets Remember". In 2 Volumes. Volume I: 1876–1918. Volume II: 1919–1984. RMC. Kingston, Ontario. The R.M.C. Club of Canada. 1984
Kirk-Greene, A.H.M "Canada in Africa: Sir Percy Girouard, Neglected Colonial Governor" pages 207-239 from African Affairs, Volume 83, No 331, April 1984.
Lowry, Donal "The Crown, Empire Loyalism, and Assimilation of Non-British White Subjects in the British World: An Argument against 'Ethnic Determinism'" pages 98–120 from The Journal of Imperial and Commonwealth History, Volume 31, Issue 2, June 2003 
Pigott, Peter Canada in Sudan War Without Borders, Toronto: Dundurn Press, 2009

External links
 Sir Percy Girouard, Governor of Northern Nigeria, 1907–1909

 The Crown, Empire Loyalism, and Assimilation of Non-British White Subjects in the British World: An Argument against 'Ethnic Determinism'

1867 births
1932 deaths
Colonial governors and administrators of Kenya
Canadian Knights Commander of the Order of St Michael and St George
Canadian Militia officers
French Quebecers
People from Montreal
Recipients of the Order of the Medjidie, 2nd class
Royal Military College of Canada alumni
Companions of the Distinguished Service Order
British Governors and Governors-General of Nigeria
Burials at Brookwood Cemetery
British Kenya people